Bukit Minyak is an industrial zone in Central Seberang Perai District, Penang, Malaysia.

References 

Central Seberang Perai District
Populated places in Penang